The 2018 Cupa României Final was the final match of the 2017–18 Cupa României and the 80th final of the Cupa României, Romania's premier football cup competition. It was played on 27 May 2018 between Hermannstadt and Universitatea Craiova.

Hermannstadt reached their first ever cup final in the third year of the club's existence. They are the 14th team, and the first in 36 years, to reach the final while not playing in the top league.

This was the first final for Universitatea since 1991, and the first for a team from Craiova in 18 years.

The winner qualified for the 2018–19 UEFA Europa League. They also earned the right to play against 2017–18 Liga I champions for the 2018 Supercupa României.

The game was hosted by the Arena Națională stadium in Bucharest.

Route to the Final

Match

References

External links
 Official site 

2018
2017–18 in Romanian football
CS Universitatea Craiova matches
FC Hermannstadt matches